Valdemaras Martinkėnas (10 March 1965 – 20 July 2004) was a Soviet and Lithuanian professional footballer and coach.

Career
Born in Alytus, Martinkėnas was the goalkeeper for the Lithuanian national team in the years after independence from the USSR, appearing in most of the qualifying games for the 1994 World Cup. He won 19 caps for his country.

He also won the Lithuanian league championship with Zalgiris Vilnius in 1991, and starred in Dynamo Kyiv's 1992–93 Ukrainian league championship win. Later, he became goalkeeping coach to the Estonian national side.

Martinkėnas died at the age of 39 in Nova Gorica in Slovenia, drowning in a strong current after having gone for a swim in a mountain river. He was the goalkeeping coach of Flora Tallinn at the time, and was in Slovenia preparing for their Champions League qualifier against NK Gorica.

Honours
 A Lyga champion: 1991.
 A Lyga bronze: 1990.
 Ukrainian Premier League champion: 1993.
 Ukrainian Premier League runner-up: 1992.

European club competitions
 1989–90 UEFA Cup with FK Žalgiris Vilnius: 4 games.
 1990–91 European Cup with FC Dynamo Kyiv: 2 games.

External links
 
 

Soviet footballers
Lithuanian footballers
Lithuania international footballers
Lithuanian expatriate footballers
FK Žalgiris players
FK Atlantas players
FC Dynamo Kyiv players
FC Dynamo-2 Kyiv players
Ukrainian Premier League players
Ukrainian First League players
FC Wil players
FC Haka players
Veikkausliiga players
FC KAMAZ Naberezhnye Chelny players
Soviet Top League players
Russian Premier League players
FC Kuressaare players
A Lyga players
Lithuanian football managers
Lithuanian expatriate football managers
Expatriate footballers in Ukraine
Expatriate footballers in Finland
Lithuanian expatriate sportspeople in Ukraine
Accidental deaths in Slovenia
Deaths by drowning
1965 births
2004 deaths
Sportspeople from Alytus
FK Kareda Kaunas players
Association football goalkeepers
Expatriate footballers in Estonia
Expatriate footballers in Russia
Expatriate footballers in Switzerland